Vernon Nile Bennett (August 18, 1936 – November 30, 2008) was an American politician in the state of Iowa.

Bennett was born in Winterset, Iowa. He was a union representative. He served in the Iowa House of Representatives from 1967 to 1973 as a Democrat. He died on November 30, 2008, aged 72.

References

1936 births
2008 deaths
People from Winterset, Iowa
Democratic Party members of the Iowa House of Representatives
20th-century American politicians